Menesia albifrons is a species of beetle in the family Cerambycidae. It was described by Heyden in 1886. It is known from Russia.

References

Menesia
Beetles described in 1886